Novak Djokovic defeated Roger Federer in the final, 6–4, 5–7, 6–4, 6–4 to win the men's singles tennis title at the 2015 US Open. 	It was his second US Open title and tenth major title overall. By reaching the final, Djokovic became the third man to reach all four major finals in the same year in the Open Era, after Rod Laver and Federer. The final was also a rematch of the final at the Cincinnati Masters three weeks earlier, which Federer won in straight sets.

Marin Čilić was the defending champion, but lost to Djokovic in the semifinals.

This was the first time since the 2010 US Open that Andy Murray lost before the quarterfinals of a major, losing to Kevin Anderson in the fourth round. This ended a streak of 18 consecutive Grand Slam quarterfinals (not counting the 2013 French Open, which he missed due to injury).

This marked the last US Open appearances for 2001 champion and former world No. 1 Lleyton Hewitt, and former world No. 2 Tommy Haas.

Seeds

Qualifying

Draw

Finals

Top half

Section 1

Section 2

Section 3

Section 4

Bottom half

Section 5

Section 6

Section 7

Section 8

Nationalities in the field

References

External links
 Singles draw
2015 US Open – Men's draws and results at the International Tennis Federation

Men's Singles
US Open – Men's Singles
US Open (tennis) by year – Men's singles